Christian Sarron (born 27 March 1955 in Clermont-Ferrand, France) is a French former Grand Prix motorcycle road racer.


Motorcycle racing career
He began his career on a Kawasaki when he met French Grand Prix racer Patrick Pons. Pons helped him get his start in the international racing circuit. His first victory came in the rain in the 1977 German Grand Prix. He was injured in a 750cc race which would begin a trend of numerous injuries for the next few years. In 1982, he again won in the rain at the Finnish Grand Prix, cementing his reputation as an exceptional wet weather rider.  He finished the 1982 season 8th in the 350 class and 10th in the 250 class.

He would finish second to Carlos Lavado in the 1983 250 class with another Grand Prix victory in the Swedish Grand Prix. In 1984, he won three times on a Yamaha and captured the 250 World Championship.

The following year saw him move up to the premiere 500cc division with the Gauloises-Yamaha team where he won again in the rain at the 1985 German Grand Prix. He finished the season in an impressive third place to Freddie Spencer and Eddie Lawson. In 1989, he again finished third in the 500cc championship behind Lawson and Wayne Rainey.

Sarron's 500cc career occurred at a time when the bikes suited the sliding style of the Americans who had been brought up on dirt oval tracks, yet Sarron still managed to post respectable results. In 1994, he teamed up with his brother Dominique Sarron to win the prestigious Bol d'or endurance race. In 1995 he retired from competition to take on the role of team director for Yamaha's Superbike team.

Grand Prix career statistics

Points system from 1969 to 1987:

Points system from 1988 to 1992:

(key) (Races in bold indicate pole position; races in italics indicate fastest lap)

References

Sportspeople from Clermont-Ferrand
French motorcycle racers
250cc World Championship riders
350cc World Championship riders
500cc World Championship riders
1955 births
Living people
250cc World Riders' Champions